Chess was contested at the 2006 Asian Games in Doha, Qatar from 2 December 2006 to 14 December 2006. Rapid Chess was held for men and women individually as well as a mixed team Standard Chess competition. All events were held at the Al-Dana Indoor Hall.

India topped the medal table with two gold medals, Kazakhstan won the men's individual gold.

Schedule

Medalists

Medal table

Participating nations
A total of 63 athletes from 21 nations competed in chess at the 2006 Asian Games:

References

 Men's Individual Results
 Women's Individual Results
 Team Results

 
2006 Asian Games events
Asian Games
2006
Asian Games 2006